Grupo de Apoyo Mutuo (GAM) is a Guatemalan organization. It is a collaboration between two of Guatemala's longest standing human rights-based NGO, Grupo De Apoyo Mutuo and Haverford College Libraries. GAM itself was founded in 1984 during the internal armed conflict with a group of people looking for their missing loved ones. The relationship between GAM and Haverford College Libraries began when a Haverford professor and GAM met while researching in Guatemala. Both parties shared a common interest in preserving GAM's archive and they quickly collaborated. The main goal of GAM is to bring together the families of people who forcibly disappeared during the Guatemalan Civil War from 1960 to 1996 and to seek justice for people who disappeared.

Over the past couple of years GAM has grown substantially in size and influence;additionally, Haverford has begun to fund projects for students to do. These projects have taken on a variety of forms, including research on nonviolent resistance efforts taken by the GAM, the voices of women and mothers in the archive, and a process of demographic analysis to depict who is in the archive, among others. The GAM was nominated to receive a Nobel Peace Prize in 1986.

References 

Haverford College
Human rights organizations based in Guatemala
Organizations established in 1984
1984 establishments in Guatemala
Guatemalan Civil War